Charles Henle Klein, Jr. (born March 20, 1942), is an American author, best known for writing about police ethics, and the technique of instinct combat shooting, He is also a firearms instructor, a former law enforcement officer and a retired private investigator.

Career 

Klein was a police officer in Ohio from 1968 to 1975 and later his family had moved to Indiana and Klein became a police officer there. He is a NRA (National Rifle Association) certified firearms instructor in five disciplines and is a former staff instructor for Tactical Defense Institute.
 
From 1979 to 2004, Chuck Klein was licensed as a private detective in Indiana and then Ohio.
 
In 1992, Klein wrote "America Is Beautiful", which was read into the U.S. Congressional Record. He wrote Lines of Defense, Police Ideology and the Constitution in 2000 to raise awareness for law enforcement officers of their constitutional obligations. In 2004, Klein wrote about instinct shooting in his book, Instinct Combat Shooting, Defensive Handgunning for Police as a result of studying police training methods. Klein is also known for writing The Badge, Stories and Tales from Both Sides of the Law and the autobiographical novel Circa 1957.

Selected bibliography 
 "America is Beautiful," The United States Congressional Record, 1992
 Lines of Defense, Police Ideology and the Constitution. 2000, Institute of Police Technology and Management.
 Guns in the WorkPlace, A Manual for Private Sector Employers and Employees, 2006, Merril Press.
 The Badge, Stories and Tales from Both Sides of the Law. 2011, BeachHouse Press.
 Circa 1957, 2nd Edition, 2012, BeachHouse Press.
 Where the Old Highway Had Run: Classic Tales of the Road and Beyond, 2015, BeachHouse Books.
 Instinct Combat Shooting, Defensive Handgunning for Police, 4th Edition, 2016, CRC Press Taylor & Francis Group.
 America's Framework For Freedom, A Simplified Look At The U.S. Constitution'', 2020, Second Amendment Foundation & U.S. Concealed Carry Association.

See also 
 Point shooting
 Criminal justice ethics
 Nostalgia drag racing

References

External links 
Official website
Columnist: Nostalgia Drag World Magazine
Firearms Editor, P.I. Magazine

Living people
Criminal justice ethics
1942 births
American male writers